Charles F. Jenkins was a Democratic member of the Georgia House of Representatives, representing the 8th district from 2003 to 2008.

Charles F. Jenkins seat was won by Stephen Allison on November 5, 2008.

External links
Georgia General Assembly - Representative Charles Jenkins official GA House website
Project Vote Smart - Representative Charles Jenkins (GA) profile
Follow the q - Charles F. Jenkins
2006 2004 campaign contributions

Members of the Georgia House of Representatives
Living people
Year of birth missing (living people)
21st-century American politicians